Robert Joseph Ross (born December 23, 1936) is an American former football coach. He served as the head football coach at The Citadel (1973–1977), the University of Maryland, College Park (1982–1986), the Georgia Tech (1987–1991), and the United States Military Academy (2004–2006), compiling a career college football coaching record of 103–101–2. Ross was also the head coach of the National Football League's San Diego Chargers from 1992 to 1996 and the Detroit Lions from 1997 to 2000, tallying a career NFL mark of 77–68. He guided his 1990 Georgia Tech squad to the UPI national championship and coached the 1994 San Diego Chargers to an appearance in Super Bowl XXIX.

Education and playing career
After graduating from Benedictine High School in 1955, Ross enrolled at the Virginia Military Institute, where he started at quarterback and defensive back for two seasons and served as captain of the football team as a senior. Ross graduated from VMI in 1959 with a Bachelor of Arts degree in English and history.

Coaching career

Early years
Following a tour of duty in the United States Army as a first lieutenant (1960–1962), Ross found work coaching high school football. He coached at Colonial Heights High School, and at his own nearby alma mater of Benedictine, both located near Richmond, Virginia. He then moved on to coaching at the college level, starting with assistant coaching stints at William & Mary, Rice, and Maryland before accepting his first head coaching job in 1973 at The Citadel, The Military College of South Carolina, located in Charleston, South Carolina.

Ross was the 16th head football coach at The Citadel and held that position for five seasons, from 1973 until 1977. His record at The Citadel was 24 –31.

Ross then spent four years as an assistant coach with the Kansas City Chiefs (1978–1981) under head coach Marv Levy, before returning to the collegiate ranks as head coach at Maryland. He won three consecutive Atlantic Coast Conference (ACC) Championships from 1983 to 1985. After four years, Ross left Maryland and was introduced as head coach of the Georgia Tech Yellow Jackets football team. on January 5, 1987.

As head coach of Georgia Tech in 1990, he led the Jackets to their best season in years. They started the year unranked, but they rose all the way to eleven by the sixth week of the season, having beat two ranked teams on their way to a 5-0 record. Their one blemish came against North Carolina, who they tied 13–13 (ties would be abolished by the NCAA years later). After going from 11 to 16 in the AP Poll, the Jackets rolled on, with their best achievement being against Virginia. In that game, 16th ranked Tech faced #1 Virginia on the road. They rallied from a 28–14 halftime deficit to win 41–38 on a Scott Sisson field goal with seven seconds remaining. From there, Tech continued to win and rise in the polls, going from 16th to seventh to fourth to second by the time of their final game of the regular season against Georgia, which they won to clinch an unbeaten record of 11–0–1 record. The ACC championship was the school's first conference title since 1952, while they were still in the Southeastern Conference. As such, they were invited to play in the 1991 Florida Citrus Bowl as ACC championship against Nebraska (ranked 19th in the AP Poll) on January 1, 1991, the same day that #1 Colorado played in the Orange Bowl. The Yellow Jackets prevailed 45–21. 

Colorado had gone 5-1-1 against ranked teams (while Tech won all four of their ranked games), but what set off debate was their victory in a game later called the Fifth Down Game, in which an error by the officials helped Colorado prevail over Missouri. A subsequent 10–9 squeaker over Notre Dame in the Orange Bowl led to further debate, as there was no sort of alliance between Division I-A teams to force a national championship game until the Bowl Coalition in 1992.

Later that year, the Yellow Jackets were awarded a share of the national championship by finishing first in the final Coaches' Poll, while Colorado kept their top spot in the AP Poll. Ross won the Paul "Bear" Bryant Award and the Bobby Dodd Coach of the Year Award.

San Diego Chargers
He then left to become head coach of the San Diego Chargers, where the highlight of his tenure would be an AFC Championship and San Diego's first trip to the Super Bowl after the 1994 season where they fell to the 49ers, 49–26. Ross' first season in San Diego (1992) saw the Chargers drop the first four regular season games, but they recovered to win 11 of their final 12 games to win the AFC West, their first division title since 1981. In his five seasons with the Chargers, they won two division titles and made the playoffs three times. His regular season coaching record with the Chargers was 47–33, and 3–3 in the playoffs.

Detroit Lions
Following the 1996 season, Ross left the Chargers to take a more lucrative, and perhaps more rewarding position as the head coach of the Detroit Lions, where he would have control of all player personnel decisions and be able to hire his own staff. He held the position until the middle of the 2000 season. Detroit had long been considered underachievers under Wayne Fontes (winning one playoff game in his tenure), and Ross was brought in to provide the team a more structured atmosphere. It was a challenging endeavor, as Detroit had developed somewhat of a "country club" atmosphere under Fontes' leadership, and veteran players on the roster ultimately came to resent Ross for running tougher practices, instilling weight requirements, curfews, etc. Ross sought to change the identity of the Detroit Lions, having them become a more traditional, physical, football team, less dependent on Hall of Fame running back Barry Sanders for success.

He structured his drafts accordingly, drafting highly regarded college offensive linemen such as Stockar McDougle and Aaron Gibson, neither of which panned out professionally. Ultimately, Ross was unable to change the culture in Detroit. He became frustrated at what he perceived to be the team's lack of effort, accusing them of just playing for their paychecks. In November 2000, following a home loss to the Miami Dolphins, having had enough of what he called his team's unwillingness to "fight back," he resigned in mid-season. Although his frustration with the Lions organization was evident, Ross later claimed that his primary reason for leaving when he did was due to blood clots in his legs. It is also noteworthy to mention that the 1999 Detroit team achieved the playoffs—albeit with an 8–8 record after losses in the final four regular season games, plus a first-round exit against the Washington Redskins—despite the unexpected retirement of Barry Sanders prior to training camp.

Army Black Knights
As head coach at Army, Ross reportedly received $600,000 in annual salary, which was seen as evidence of Army's eagerness to right the program after the team's 0–13 record in 2003. During his three-year term as Army head coach, Ross improved their record to 9–25, up from 4–32 over the three years before Ross's arrival. Ross retired from coaching in 2007.

Personal life
Ross and his wife, Alice, have three sons, two daughters, and 18 grandchildren. Their sons Chris and Kevin graduated from the United States Air Force Academy and United States Naval Academy, in 1984 and 1988, respectively. Kevin served for a time as Army's offensive coordinator and running backs coach under his father, but was not kept in that post under Ross's replacement, Stan Brock. Chris is currently the coach for Fairfax Home School's varsity soccer team, based in Fairfax, Virginia.

Honors
In 1997, Ross was inducted into the Virginia Sports Hall of Fame.

Head coaching record

College

NFL

References

External links
 Army profile
 Detroit profile
 Bobby Ross at the New Georgia Encyclopedia

1936 births
Living people
Sportspeople from Richmond, Virginia
Players of American football from Richmond, Virginia
American football defensive backs
American football quarterbacks
VMI Keydets football players
United States Army officers
VMI Keydets football coaches
William & Mary Tribe football coaches
High school football coaches in Virginia
Rice Owls football coaches
Maryland Terrapins football coaches
The Citadel Bulldogs football coaches
Kansas City Chiefs coaches
Georgia Tech Yellow Jackets football coaches
San Diego Chargers head coaches
Detroit Lions head coaches
Army Black Knights football coaches